Bevens Creek is a stream in Carver and Sibley counties, in the U.S. state of Minnesota.

Bevens Creek was named for an early settler.

See also
List of rivers of Minnesota

References

Rivers of Carver County, Minnesota
Rivers of Sibley County, Minnesota
Rivers of Minnesota